Levi R. Kelley (January 26, 1899 – February 14, 1967) was a Vermont political figure.  A Republican, he served as Vermont State Treasurer and later as treasurer of the University of Vermont.

Biography
Levi Ray Kelley was born in Malone, New York on January 26, 1899, a son of Michael Kelley and Ella (Duke) Kelley, and his family moved to Montpelier, Vermont in 1902. Kelley attended the public schools of Montpelier, and graduated from Montpelier High School in 1917.

On June 23, 1917, Kelley joined the United States Army for World War I.  He completed quartermaster training at Camp Jackson, South Carolina, and was promoted through the ranks to the grade of sergeant. He began officer training school at Camp Gordon, Georgia, but was discharged on November 30, 1918, shortly after the end of the war.

After his military service, Kelley began a business career, and became billing clerk and cashier for the Montpelier and Wells River Railroad.

In 1919 Kelley married Ruth Emery in Belmont, Massachusetts. They were the parents of five children: Jerome; Frank; David; Lee; and Nancy.

In 1924 Kelley began to work in the office of the Vermont State Treasurer. In 1926 he was appointed Assistant State Treasurer. In 1931 he was appointed Deputy State Treasurer.

Kelley was elected Vermont State Treasurer in 1942. He served from 1943 to 1949, when he resigned.

He resigned as state treasurer in August, 1949 in order to accept appointment as treasurer and business manager of the University of Vermont. He worked for UVM until retiring in 1959.

Kelley died in Waterbury, Vermont on February 14, 1967. He was buried at Green Mount Cemetery in Montpelier.

References

1899 births
1967 deaths
People from Malone, New York
People from Montpelier, Vermont
United States Army personnel of World War I
Vermont Republicans
State treasurers of Vermont
Burials at Green Mount Cemetery (Montpelier, Vermont)